William Lewis Mooty (May 23, 1906 – June 16, 1992), was an American Republican politician, farmer, and lawyer who served as the Lieutenant Governor of Iowa from 1961 until 1965.

Born in Grundy County, Iowa, Mooty served in the United States Army Air Forces during World War II. Mooty received his bachelor's and law degrees from University of Iowa. He practiced law and managed his farm. Mooty served on the Grundy Center, Iowa city council and in the Iowa House of Representatives. He later served as Lieutenant Governor of Iowa under Norman A. Erbe and Harold E. Hughes.

References

1906 births
1992 deaths
People from Grundy County, Iowa
Military personnel from Iowa
University of Iowa alumni
University of Iowa College of Law alumni
Iowa lawyers
Iowa city council members
Republican Party members of the Iowa House of Representatives
Lieutenant Governors of Iowa
People from Grundy Center, Iowa
20th-century American politicians
20th-century American lawyers